South Frankfort Historic District is a national historic district located at Frankfort, Clinton County, Indiana.  The district encompasses 151 contributing buildings and 1 contributing structures in a predominantly residential section of Frankfort. The district developed between about 1875 and 1940, and includes notable examples of Italianate, Queen Anne, Colonial Revival, and Bungalow / American Craftsman style residential architecture.  Notable buildings include the Hammersley Building (c. 1940), First Baptist Church (1912-1913), and Masonic Temple (1912).

It was added to the National Register of Historic Places in 2009.

References

Houses on the National Register of Historic Places in Indiana
Historic districts on the National Register of Historic Places in Indiana
Italianate architecture in Indiana
Queen Anne architecture in Indiana
Colonial Revival architecture in Indiana
Historic districts in Clinton County, Indiana
National Register of Historic Places in Clinton County, Indiana